Khovaling is a village and jamoat in Tajikistan. It is located in Khovaling District in Khatlon Region. The jamoat has a total population of 10,601 (2015). It is the seat of Khovaling District.

References

Populated places in Khatlon Region